The Algerian Party for Democracy and Socialism (PADS) is a Communist party in Algeria. When in 1993, during the Algerian Civil War, Ettehadi was realigned as a democratic movement resisting Islamism, the Marxist–Leninist wing split apart under the leadership of Abdelhamid Benzine to retain its Marxist–Leninist legacy.

PADS publishes the newspaper Le Lien des Ouvriers et Paysans (The Link of the Workers and Peasants).

References

External links 
 

1993 establishments in Algeria
Communist parties in Algeria
Political parties established in 1993
Political parties in Algeria
International Meeting of Communist and Workers Parties